Heaven Shall Burn... When We Are Gathered is the fourth studio album by Swedish black metal band Marduk. It was recorded and mixed at The Abyss in January 1996 and released on July 1 that year by Osmose Productions. It was re-released in digipak format with bonus tracks on June 27, 2006. Heaven Shall Burn... When We Are Gathered is the first Marduk album to feature Legion, formerly of Ophthalamia, on vocals and Peter Tägtgren as mixer. This album marked a shift in style for what Marduk are popularly known for; hyper-blast blast beats and furious drum work, sheer brutality over melody (compared to previous releases), and raw vocals.

The music for "Glorification of the Black God" is an adaptation of Modest Mussorgsky's "Night on Bald Mountain". The first guitar riff is from a score in the 1939 version of The Wizard of Oz. Furthermore, the lyrics of the song are clearly inspired by "Bald Mountain's" basic theme (a witches' Sabbath on St. John's Night). The title of the album is a reference to the Bathory song "Dies Irae" from Blood Fire Death. It has also inspired the name of German melodic death metal/metalcore band Heaven Shall Burn.

Track listing

Personnel
Marduk
 Legion – vocals
 Morgan Steinmeyer Håkansson – guitar
 B. War – bass
 Fredrik Andersson – drums

References

1996 albums
Marduk (band) albums
Osmose Productions albums
Regain Records albums
Albums produced by Peter Tägtgren